AIDAstella is a Sphinx-class cruise ship, built at Meyer Werft for AIDA Cruises. She is the seventh Sphinx series ship, preceded by sisters AIDAdiva, AIDAbella, AIDAluna, AIDAblu, AIDAsol and AIDAmar. AIDAstella was delivered to the shipping company by Meyer Werft on 11 March 2013.

AIDAstella is of the same size as her sister ships (71,300 Gross Tons).
Two five bladed propellers drive her through the water at 23 knots. She also features a pair of bow thrusters, a pair of stern thrusters, a pair of stabilisers and twin rudders.

From 3 to 8 March 2018, AIDAstella underwent a dry dock in Dubai during which various public venues were refurbished.

References

External links

Ships of AIDA Cruises
2013 ships
Ships built in Papenburg